This is a list of the 322 members of the 16th legislature of the Italian Senate that were elected in the 2008 general election. The legislature met from 29 April 2008 to 14 March 2013.

Senators for life are marked with a "(L)"

The People of Freedom

Democratic Party

Lega Nord

Italy of Values

UDC, STTP and Autonomous
 Giulio Andreotti (L)
 Antonello Antinoro
 Emilio Colombo (L)
 Francesco Cossiga (L)
 Salvatore Cuffaro
 Giampiero D'Alia
 Antonio Fosson
 Mirella Giai
 Oskar Peterlini
 Manfred Pinzger
 Helga Thaler Ausserhofer

Mixed group

Movement for the Autonomy
 Vincenzo Oliva
 Giovanni Pistorio

Independents
 Carlo Azeglio Ciampi (L)
 Rita Levi-Montalcini (L)
 Sergio Pininfarina (L)
 Oscar Luigi Scalfaro (L)
 Mario Monti (L)

References

Lists of political office-holders in Italy
Lists of legislators by term
Lists of members of upper houses